Mombin may refer to:
 Mombin, Iran, a village in Khuzestan Province, Iran
 Spondias purpurea — Red mombin or purple mombin, a fruit tree native to tropical America
 Spondias mombin — Yellow mombin, a fruit tree native to Brazil and Costa Rica